Polypogon tenellus is a species of annual grass in the family Poaceae (true grasses), first described by Robert Brown in 1810.  It is native to Western Australia and South Australia.

References 

tenellus
Flora of Western Australia